Warren County is a county located on the Cumberland Plateau in Middle Tennessee, one of the three Grand Divisions of the U.S. state of Tennessee. As of the 2020 census, the population was 40,953. Its county seat is McMinnville. Warren County comprises the McMinnville, TN Micropolitan Statistical Area.

History
Warren County was created in 1807 from a portion of White County, and named for Joseph Warren (1741–1775),  a soldier in the American Revolution.  The revised Tennessee State Constitution of 1834 stated that no new county could be within  of the county seat of the county from which it was formed.  The boundaries of five counties formed from Warren— Grundy, Van Buren, Cannon, Coffee and DeKalb— were exactly 12 miles from Warren's county seat, McMinnville, giving the county its distinctive round shape.
Warren County was the site of several saltpeter mines.  Saltpeter is the main ingredient of gunpowder and was obtained by leaching the earth from several local caves.  Hubbards Cave, near Camp Woodlee, was a major operation. Henshaw Cave on Cardwell Mountain (now part of Cumberland Caverns) and Solomon Saltpeter Cave on Ben Lomond Mountain were relatively small mining operations. Most saltpeter mining occurred during the War of 1812 and in the Civil War.

The county was largely developed for farming of such crops as tobacco and hemp. While numerous families held enslaved African Americans as workers, they were a minority of the population. Warren County citizens voted to secede from the Union before the American War Between the States in February 1861 in a state referendum. Voters in Tennessee overall decided to remain in the Union in that time. When President Abraham Lincoln demanded that Tennessee provide troops to fight against the Southern states in April 1861, it was viewed as a violation of Article 3, Section 3 of the U.S. Constitution. At a new referendum in June 1861, Warren County again, along with a majority of Tennessee's counties, voted for secession. Unlike in some states, slavery was not listed as one of the reasons in Tennessee's secession proclamation.

Men from Warren County and surrounding upper Cumberland region formed and served in many units in Tennessee's defense, including the 16th Tennessee Infantry   led by McMinnville resident Col. John Houston Savage. The Confederate monument  next to the county courthouse is dedicated in the memory of the men who served and died in the 16th and lists their names.

Men from Warren County and upper Cumberland area joined the 16th TN Infantry Regiment, among others. Their flag is on display at the Texas 'Civil War' Museum in Fort Worth TX.

Geography

The county lies long the Eastern Highland Rim, near the Cumberland Plateau.

The Caney Fork forms part of the county's borders with White and DeKalb counties to the north.  The Rocky River, a tributary of the Caney Fork, forms part of the county's eastern border with Van Buren County.  The Collins River, also a tributary of the Caney Fork, flows through the county, and the Barren Fork, a tributary of the Collins, flows through McMinnville.

Cardwell Mountain is an imposing natural feature located five miles due east of McMinnville.  It is an erosional remnant of the nearby Cumberland Plateau.  Cardwell Mountain is noted for Cumberland Caverns, an exceptionally long cave which lies underneath the mountain.

Adjacent counties
DeKalb County (north)
White County (northeast)
Van Buren County (east)
Sequatchie County (southeast)
Grundy County (south)
Coffee County (southwest)
Cannon County (northwest)

Major highways
  U.S. Route 70S
  State Route 8
  State Route 30
  State Route 55
  State Route 56
  State Route 108
  State Route 136

State protected areas
 Hubbard's Cave State Natural Area
 Morrison Meadow State Natural Area
 Rock Island State Park (part)

Demographics

2020 census

As of the 2020 United States census, there were 40,953 people, 15,727 households, and 10,167 families residing in the county.

2000 census
As of the census of 2000, there were 38,276 people, 15,181 households, and 10,824 families residing in the county. The population density was 88 people per square mile (34/km2). There were 16,689 housing units at an average density of 39 per square mile (15/km2). The racial makeup of the county was 91.66% White, 3.16% Black or African American, 0.21% Native American, 0.42% Asian, 0.05% Pacific Islander, 3.56% from other races, and 0.94% from two or more races. 4.92% of the population were Hispanic or Latino of any race.

There were 15,181 households, out of which 31.90% had children under the age of 18 living with them, 56.20% were married couples living together, 11.20% had a female householder with no husband present, and 28.70% were non-families. 25.00% of all households were made up of individuals, and 10.50% had someone living alone who was 65 years of age or older. The average household size was 2.47 and the average family size was 2.93.

In the county, the population was spread out, with 24.20% under the age of 18, 9.10% from 18 to 24, 29.40% from 25 to 44, 23.40% from 45 to 64, and 13.90% who were 65 years of age or older. The median age was 37 years. For every 100 females there were 96.50 males. For every 100 females age 18 and over, there were 94.70 males.

The median income for a household in the county was $30,920, and the median income for a family was $37,835. Males had a median income of $28,409 versus $20,863 for females. The per capita income for the county was $15,759. About 13.00% of families and 16.60% of the population were below the poverty line, including 20.40% of those under age 18 and 17.20% of those age 65 or over.

Recreation

Rock Island State Park is located on the northeastern border with White County. This park is the site of the Tennessee Valley Authority's Great Falls Dam, includes many hiking trails, and offers whitewater rafting.

Cumberland Caverns, located east of McMinnville under Cardwell Mountain, is Tennessee's largest show cave. Cumberland Caverns is the 15th longest cave in the United States.

Hubbard's Cave, the largest gray bat hibernaculum in Tennessee, with over 100,000 bats, is located in the county. The cave is owned by the Nature Conservancy and it is securely gated to protect the bats, which are an Endangered Species.

Falcon Rest, an 1896 Victorian mansion in McMinnville built by local manufacturer Clay Faulkner, is listed on the National Register of Historic Places (NRHP).  It is open to the public as a historic house museum. His father's mansion in the same city, Falconhurst, is also on the NRHP.

Communities

City
 McMinnville (county seat)

Towns
 Centertown
 Morrison
 Viola

Unincorporated communities

 Berea
 Bratchers Crossroads
 Campaign
 Daylight
 Irving College
 Midway
 Rock Island
 Shady Rest
 Smartt
 Spring Creek
 Stewart Chapel

Politics

Warren County was a Democratic stronghold for most of the 20th century. The last Democrat to win Warren County was Al Gore in 2000. After the 2000 election, Warren County began to trend Republican, with each passing election having an increasing margin for the Republican candidate. Donald Trump won Warren county in 2016 by 42%, compared to Mitt Romney's margin of 25% in 2012.

See also
 National Register of Historic Places listings in Warren County, Tennessee

References

External links

 Warren County Government
 Warren County Chamber of Commerce
 Warren County Historical Markers
 Warren County TNGenWeb
 

 
1807 establishments in Tennessee
Populated places established in 1807
Counties of Appalachia
Middle Tennessee